Luke Plunket may refer to:
 Luke Plunket, 1st Earl of Fingall
 Luke Plunket, 3rd Earl of Fingall